"Alien" is a song by Atlanta Rhythm Section. It was released as a single in 1981 from their album Quinella.

The song was the band's final Top 40 hit, peaking at No. 29 on the Billboard Hot 100. It reached the top 20 on Billboard's Adult Contemporary and Rock charts, peaking at No. 16 and No. 18, respectively. Overall, it is their final charted single.

Chart performance

References

1981 songs
1981 singles
Atlanta Rhythm Section songs
Songs written by Buddy Buie
Columbia Records singles